Nela Park is the headquarters of GE Lighting, a Savant company, and is located in East Cleveland, Ohio, United States. Nela Park is the first industrial park in the world being home to most of the lighting breakthroughs of the last century.

The institute was first organized by entrepreneurs Franklin Terry and Burton Tremaine of the National Electric Lamp Company. Development of the site was started in 1911 when the National Electric Lamp Association (NELA), formed by John Robert Crouse, Sr, J.B. Crouse, and H.A. Tremaine in 1901, was dissolved and absorbed into General Electric. It was the first industrial park in the world, and was added to the National Register of Historic Places in 1975. The campus emulates a university setting, and the dominant architectural style is Georgian Revival. The  campus is home to GE's Lighting & Electrical Institute, which was founded in 1933.  Each December, Nela Park features a world-famous Christmas lighting display, which culminates in a miniature version of the National Christmas Tree in Washington, D.C., designed by GE Lighting.

Ownership 
In March 2022, GE Lighting sold Nela Park to Phoenix Investors, an affiliate of a Milwaukee-based real estate firm.

See also 
 Marvin Pipkin - a scientist engineer that had many inventions and innovations for the light bulb and worked at NELA Park.

References

External links

GE Lighting History

East Cleveland, Ohio
General Electric
National Register of Historic Places in Cuyahoga County, Ohio
Industrial parks in the United States
Buildings and structures in Cuyahoga County, Ohio
Industrial buildings and structures in Ohio
Industrial buildings and structures on the National Register of Historic Places in Ohio